Love Island (series 1) may refer to:

 Love Island (2005 TV series, series 1)
 Love Island (2015 TV series, series 1)